Lyubimoye is a rural locality (a selo) in Svyatorussovsky Selsoviet of Romnensky District, Amur Oblast, Russia. The population was 118 as of 2018. There are 3 streets.

Geography 
Lyubimoye is located on the right bank of the Belaya River, 16 km southwest of Romny (the district's administrative centre) by road. Svyatorussovka is the nearest rural locality.

References 

Rural localities in Romnensky District